Glenn Matthew Kilpatrick (born 29 August 1972) is a former Australian rules footballer who played for  and  in the Australian Football League (AFL) and West Adelaide in the South Australian National Football League (SANFL).

Originally with the  Under-19s, Kilpatrick transferred to Essendon and made his senior AFL debut in 1992. He appeared just 26 times in three seasons for the Bombers and then spent a season playing for the West Adelaide Football Club in the SANFL. He was a joint winner of the 1995 Magarey Medal, with Norwood's Garry McIntosh. 

In 1996 Kilpatrick moved to Geelong and would play 120 games for the club, finishing second in their 1997 best and fairest award.

External links 

1972 births
Essendon Football Club players
Geelong Football Club players
Living people
Magarey Medal winners
West Adelaide Football Club players
Australian rules footballers from Victoria (Australia)